The Pleosporales is the largest order in the fungal class Dothideomycetes.  By a 2008 estimate it contains 23 families, 332 genera and more than 4700 species. The majority of species are saprobes on decaying plant material in fresh water, marine, or terrestrial environments, but several species are also associated with living plants as parasites, epiphytes or endophytes. The best studied species cause plant diseases on important agricultural crops e.g. Cochliobolus heterostrophus, causing southern corn leaf blight on maize, Phaeosphaeria nodorum (Stagonospora nodorum) causing glume blotch on wheat and Leptosphaeria maculans causing a stem canker (called blackleg) on cabbage crops (Brassica). Some species of Pleosporales occur on animal dung and a small number occur as lichens  and rock-inhabiting fungi.

Taxonomy
The order was proposed in 1955 as Dothideomycetes with perithecioid ascomata with pseudoparaphyses amongst the asci, at which time there were seven families (Botryosphaeriaceae, Didymosphaeriaceae, Herpotrichiellaceae, Lophiostomataceae, Mesnieraceae, Pleosporaceae, and Venturiaceae). Three further families were added in 1973 (Dimeriaceae, Mycoporaceae, and Sporormiaceae). The order was only formally described in 1987 (Barr) with 21 families. Five families were added in 2009 (Aigialaceae, Amniculicolaceae, Lentitheciaceae, Tetraplosphaeriaceae, and Trematosphaeriaceae). The family Halojulellaceae was circumscribed in 2013, Roussoellaceae was introduced by Liu et al. (2014), and the family Tzeananaceae in 2018.

Subdivision
Margaret E. Barr in 1979, originally accepted six suborders within which to arrange the families. A suborder, Pleosporineae has been proposed, including four families (Didymellaceae, Leptosphaeriaceae, Phaeosphaeriaceae and Pleosporaceae). Families Ascocylindricaceae, Coniothyriaceae, Cucurbitariaceae, Dothidotthiaceae, Halojulellaceae, Neopyrenochaetaceae, Neophaeosphaeriaceae, Parapyrenochaetaceae, Pseudopyrenochaetaceae, Pyrenochaetopsidaceae, Shiraiaceae and Tzeananiaceae joined them later in 2015. 

Also suborder Massarineae with five families (Lentitheciaceae, Massarinaceae, Montagnulaceae, Morosphaeriaceae and Trematosphaeriaceae).
In 2015, with dna analysis, the monophyletic status of the Dictyosporiaceae, Didymosphaeriaceae, Latoruaceae, Macrodiplodiopsidaceae, Massarinaceae, Morosphaeriaceae, and Trematosphaeriaceae was strongly supported, while the clades of the Bambusicolaceae and the Lentitheciaceae are only moderately supported. Two new families, Parabambusicolaceae and Sulcatisporaceae, were proposed in 2015.

Phylogenetics
The Pleosporales form a well supported clade, with 17 subclades. As a result of phylogenetic studies, the Pleosporales have undergone considerable reorganisation, particularly with reference to the very large genus Phoma and the family Didymellaceae. Consequently, a number of genera considered incertae sedis have now been placed within the latter family.

Genera incertae sedis
These are genera of the Pleosporales of uncertain taxonomy that have not been placed in any family.

Amarenomyces
Anguillospora
Aquaticheirospora
Ascochyta
Ascochytella
Ascochytula
Ascorhombispora
Ascoronospora
Berkleasmium
Briansuttonia
Centrospora
Cheiromoniliophora
Cheirosporium
Clavariopsis
Coronospora
Dactuliophora
Dictyosporium
Didymocrea
Digitodesmium
Elegantimyces
Extrusothecium
Farlowiella
Fusculina
Helicascus
Herpotrichia
Hyalobelemnospora
Immotthia
Letendraea
Margaretbarromyces
Massariosphaeria
Metameris
Monoblastiopsis
Mycocentrospora
Mycodidymella
Neopeckia
Neophaeosphaeria
Ocala
Ochrocladosporium
Paraliomyces
Passerinula
Periconia
Phaeostagonospora
Protocucurbitaria
Pseudochaetosphaeronema
Pseudodidymella
Pseudotrichia
Pyrenochaeta
Rhopographus
Setomelanomma
Shiraia
Speira
Sporidesmium
Sporocybe
Subbaromyces
Trematosphaeriopsis
Versicolorisporium
Wettsteinina
Wicklowia

Although in 2009 when Lentitheciaceae was established it placed various genera such as Lentithecium and Tingoldiago, plus others.

Evolution
The oldest members of Pleosporales are the fossil genera Margaretbarromyces, which was described from Eocene age strata on Vancouver Island, British Columbia, and Cryptodidymosphaerites, described from the Ypresian Princeton chert in the British Columbian interior.

References

Bibliography

 
Ascomycota orders
Lichen orders
Taxa described in 1987